Stray Bullets may refer to:

 Stray Bullets (comics), American independent comic book series
 "Stray Bullets", eleventh song on Agent 51's 2000 album Just Keep Runnin'
 "Stray Bullets", sixth episode of the American Western television series Paradise (1988–91)
 Stray Bullets (film), a 2016 American thriller film

See also
 Stray bullet
 Stray Bullet (disambiguation)